Frank E. Pawlowski is a former police officer who served as commissioner for the Pennsylvania State Police.

Early life
Frank E. Pawlowski was the son of a Pennsylvania State Police trooper.

In 1976, he graduated from West Chester State College with a bachelor's degree in criminal justice.

Police career
In 1978, Pawlowski enlisted in the state police and was assigned to Troop J in Embreeville, Pennsylvania. Among other roles, he worked as a hostage negotiator, an investigator of the Camp Hill Prison riots, and a special counsel for state attorney general's probe into Pennsylvania Supreme Court Justice Rolf Larsen. In 1999, he graduated from the FBI National Academy. He became commander of Troop J in 2000 and was promoted to the rank of major in 2003.

In August 2008, after state police chief Jeffrey B. Miller stepped down from his position to take a role with the National Football League, Governor Ed Rendell named Pawlowski as acting commissioner of the state police. Pawlowski was subsequently confirmed by the Pennsylvania State Senate in October 2008. He continued to serve as the head of the state police, commanding approximately 6,000 civilian and enlisted employees, until he retired on January 7, 2011. He was succeeded by Frank Noonan, an appointee of newly-elected Governor Tom Corbett.

Pawlowski's older son, Francis J. Pawlowski, joined the Pennsylvania State Police in 2011.

References

Living people
American state police officers
State cabinet secretaries of Pennsylvania
Pennsylvania State Police
Year of birth missing (living people)